The Dnipro Arena is a football stadium in Dnipro, Ukraine.  It is mostly for football matches and hosts the homes matches of SC Dnipro-1.  The stadium has a capacity of 31,003 people. It replaced Dnipro's old Soviet Metalurh Stadium which existed since 1940.

History

The Dnipro-Arena staged the 2010 FIFA World Cup qualifying match between Ukraine and England as the Olimpiysky National Sports Complex in Kyiv was being rebuilt ready for UEFA Euro 2012.

The Dnipro-Arena was chosen as a possible venue for UEFA Euro 2012, but was dropped from the list in May 2009. The capacity fell short of the minimum 33,000 seats required by UEFA.

Dnipro-Arena hosted the 2009 Ukrainian Cup final, in which Vorskla Poltava beat Shakhtar Donetsk 1–0.

Since the beginning of the conflict in Eastern Ukraine, Dnipro have played their European matches at the Olympiskiy NSC Stadium in Kyiv at the behest of UEFA, although there has been comparatively less conflict in Dnipro than other areas.

See also
 PEOPLEnet Cup

References

External links

 Dnipro Arena on the official FC Dnipro site
 Stadium Guide profile

2008 establishments in Ukraine
Buildings and structures in Dnipro
Football venues in Dnipropetrovsk Oblast
Sport in Dnipro
FC Dnipro
Sports venues in Dnipropetrovsk Oblast
SC Dnipro-1